The Torre (Friulian: Tôr) is a river of the Province of Udine in Friuli-Venezia Giulia, northeast Italy. It is the main right tributary of the Isonzo; the Torre together with its own tributary the Natisone drain a large part of the Isonzo basin.

It flows through the communes of Tarcento and Reana del Rojale, where, as a result of the karst topography, it disappears underground. From close to the eastern periphery of the city of Udine it follows a discontinuous course until joined by the Natisone near Trivignano Udinese.

From here it flows briefly in the Province of Gorizia, receiving the torrent Judrio from the left, before returning to the Province of Udine and flowing into the Isonzo.

Rivers of the Province of Gorizia
Rivers of the Province of Udine
Braided rivers in Italy
Rivers of Italy